Denisa Vyšňovská (born 18 November 1994 in Prievidza, Slovakia) is a Slovak model and beauty pageant titleholder who was crowned Miss Slovak Republic 2015. She represented her country at the Miss Universe 2015 pageant.

Biography
Vyšňovská lives in Prievidza and is studying at university. She is a professional model in the city of Slovak Republic and represented that city at the Miss Universe Slovenskej Republiky 2015 contest.

Vyšňovská won the title of Miss Universe Slovenskej Republiky on 6 March 2015 in Bratislava. As Miss Slovak Republic 2015, she then competed at the Miss Universe 2015 pageant but did not place.

References

External links
Official Miss Universe Slovenskej Republiky website

1995 births
Living people
Slovak beauty pageant winners
Miss Universe 2015 contestants
People from Prievidza